This is a list of heritage houses in Sydney, New South Wales, Australia. The following houses are listed on the Commonwealth Heritage List, the New South Wales State Heritage Register, various local government heritage registers, and/or the (now defunct) Register of the National Estate.

See also 

Architecture of Sydney
History of Sydney

References

External links 
Heritage Homes of Wahroonga
Australian Heritage Database
New South Wales Heritage Register

 
History of Sydney
Historic houses
Heritage houses
Lists of tourist attractions in Sydney